Indrajit Gupta (18 March 1919 – 20 February 2001) was an Indian politician who belonged to the Communist Party of India (CPI). From 1996 to 1998, he served as Union Home Minister in the United Front governments of prime ministers H. D. Deve Gowda and I. K. Gujral. That was a dramatic reversal of roles, as the home ministry had, since independence in 1947, banned the CPI thrice, with many of its members, including Gupta, being sent to prison or pushed underground for long stretches. He was the longest-serving member having been elected eleven times to the Lok Sabha the lower house of Indian Parliament.He suffered his only electoral reverse when he lost to Ashok Krishna Dutt in 1977 after the CPI supported Emergency.

Early life
Gupta belonged to a Brahmo family of Calcutta. His paternal grandfather, Behari Lal Gupta, ICS, was the Dewan of Baroda and his elder brother, Ranajit Gupta, ICS, was Chief Secretary of West Bengal. His father, Satish Chandra Gupta (c. 1877–7 September 1964), who belonged to the IA&AS was an Accountant General of India and retired as Secretary of the Central Legislative Assembly in 1933. After his schooling at Ballygunge Govt. High School, he went to Simla, where his father was posted, Gupta studied at St. Stephen's College, Delhi and later went to King's College, Cambridge. While studying in England he came under the influence of Rajani Palme Dutt and joined the communist movement. With a Tripos from the University of Cambridge he returned to Calcutta in 1938 to join the peasants' and workers' movement. He not only had to go to jail for his communist activities but was also sentenced to 'party jail' in 1948 for adopting a soft stand within the party. He went underground in India during 1948–50 when there was a crackdown on Communists.

Parliamentarian
Gupta was elected to the Lok Sabha, the lower house of Parliament of India, for the first time in 1960, in a by-election. Thereafter, except for a short period from 1977 to 1980, he was a member till his death. In later years, as a result of his being the oldest member of the Lok Sabha he served as pro tem Speaker in 1996, 1998 and 1999. The office of pro tem Speaker is a ceremonial one mainly to conduct the swearing in of the newly elected members.

Gupta served on a number of parliamentary committees with distinction. He was chairman of the parliamentary standing committee on defence during 1995–1996 and was chairman of the committee on subordinate legislation from 1999 till his death. He was a member of the rules committee during 1990–1991, general purposes committee during 1985–1989 and from 1998 onwards; committee on defence from 1998–2000, committee on petitions during 1986–1987, business advisory committee from 1986–1987 and in 1989, library committee during 1990–1991 and the committee to review Lok Sabha Secretariat rules in 1990.

Gupta was conferred with the ‘Outstanding Parliamentarian’ Award in 1992. He served the Lok Sabha for 37 years, and when he died President K.R. Narayanan paid a tribute, using three characteristics in his condolence message that suitably describes the man: "Gandhian simplicity, democratic outlook and deep commitment to values."

Works
Capital and Labour in the Jute Industry and Self Reliance in National Defence

Notes

References

External links
 Official biographical sketch in Parliament of India website

1919 births
2001 deaths
Alumni of King's College, Cambridge
Communist Party of India politicians from West Bengal
India MPs 1957–1962
India MPs 1962–1967
India MPs 1967–1970
India MPs 1971–1977
India MPs 1980–1984
India MPs 1984–1989
India MPs 1989–1991
India MPs 1991–1996
India MPs 1996–1997
India MPs 1998–1999
India MPs 1999–2004
Indian accountants
Indian atheists
Lok Sabha members from West Bengal
People from Alipore
Ministers of Internal Affairs of India
Pro tem Speakers of the Lok Sabha
People from North 24 Parganas district
People from South 24 Parganas district
People from Kolkata district
People from Paschim Medinipur district
Members of the Cabinet of India